Agapostemon nasutus is a species of sweat bee in the family Halictidae.

Subspecies
These two subspecies belong to the species Agapostemon nasutus:
 Agapostemon nasutus gualanicus Cockerell
 Agapostemon nasutus nasutus

References

Further reading

 

nasutus
Articles created by Qbugbot
Insects described in 1853